Niko Piiparinen (born. July 17, 1989) is a Finnish professional ice hockey forward who currently plays for HIFK of the SM-liiga.

References

External links

1989 births
Living people
Finnish ice hockey forwards
HC Keski-Uusimaa players
HIFK (ice hockey) players
Ice hockey people from Helsinki
Kiekko-Vantaa players